Lovelock (formerly Lovelocks and Lovelocks Store) is an unincorporated community in Butte County, California.

The place gained its name when the post office moved northwards from its former location at George Lovelock's settlement in what later became known as Coutolenc. 'New Lovelock' then had a slaughterhouse, a store and a school, and the post office remained open from 1871 to 1922. The healthy mountain air has drawn many to settle along the roads running north through the forest from the Skyway road and there is now a restaurant there called the Lovelock Inn.

References

Unincorporated communities in California
Unincorporated communities in Butte County, California